America's Next Top Model (abbreviated ANTM and Top Model) is an American reality television series and interactive competition in which a number of aspiring models compete for the title of "America's Next Top Model" and a chance to begin their career in the modeling industry. Created by Tyra Banks, who also serves as an executive producer, and developed by Ken Mok and Kenya Barris. Banks also serves as host for most of the series, Rita Ora has hosted once in the series. It premiered in May 2003, and aired semiannually until 2012, then annually from 2013. The first six seasons (referred to as "cycles") aired on UPN, before UPN merged with The WB to create The CW in 2006. The following sixteen cycles aired on The CW until the series was first cancelled in October 2015. The series was revived in 2016 and aired on VH1 for two more cycles. The series was among the highest-rated programs on UPN and was the highest-rated show on The CW from 2007 to 2010.

Series overview

Episodes

Cycle 1 (2003)

Cycle 2 (2004)

Cycle 3 (2004)

Cycle 4 (2005)

Cycle 5 (2005)

Cycle 6 (2006)

Cycle 7 (2006)

Cycle 8 (2007)

Cycle 9 (2007)

Cycle 10 (2008)

Cycle 11 (2008)

Cycle 12 (2009)

Cycle 13 (2009)

Cycle 14 (2010)

Cycle 15 (2010)

Cycle 16 (2011)

Cycle 17 (2011)

Cycle 18 (2012)

Cycle 19 (2012)

Cycle 20 (2013)

Cycle 21 (2014)

Cycle 22 (2015)

Cycle 23 (2016–17)

Cycle 24 (2018)

Specials

References

External links
 
 

America's Next Top Model
Lists of American reality television series episodes